Em with tail (Ӎ ӎ; italics: Ӎ ӎ) is a letter of the Cyrillic script. Its form is derived from the Cyrillic letter Em (М м) by adding a tail to the right leg.

Em with tail is used only in the alphabet of the Kildin Sami language to represent the voiceless bilabial nasal .

Computing codes

Cyrillic letters with diacritics
Letters with hook